Hans Peter Westfal-Larsen (30 April 1872 – 7 October 1936) was founder of  Westfal-Larsen, a group of shipping companies based in Bergen, Norway.

Biography
Hans Westfal-Larsen was born in Bergen, Norway. He was the son of Hans Peter Larsen (1830–81) and Hansine Benedicte Fredriksen (1835–1908). In 1889,  he started as a clerk in the  Bergen-based shipping company Rasmus F. Olsen Shipping. He eventually became a co-owner of part of the company and in 1905, he first purchased a steamship. He established the limited company Westfal-Larsen & Co. A/S in 1918 as a consolidation of several unlimited partnerships.
In 1926, Westfal-Larsen started liner shipping to South America and in 1930 he established the Interocean Line  which sailed between Europe and the Pacific.

Personal life
He was married to Anna Fredrikke Hansen (1884–1967). They were the parents of two children. He was appointed a knight of the Order of St. Olav in 1928 and was commander of the Order of the Dannebrog. He was founder of the  H. Westfal-Larsen and wife Anna Westfal-Larsen  foundation (H. Westfal-Larsen og hustru Anna Westfal-Larsens Almennyttige fond).
He died during 1936 in  Helsingør, Denmark.

References

Other sources
Tore L. Nilsen (2005) A Century of Westfal-Larsen 1905–2005 (Bergen Maritime Museum)

External links
Westfal-Larsen website

1872 births
1936 deaths
Businesspeople from Bergen in shipping
Norwegian company founders
Order of Saint Olav
Commanders of the Order of the Dannebrog